The individual eventing event at the 2020 Summer Olympics is scheduled to take place from 30 July to 2 August 2021 at the Baji Koen and Sea Forest Cross-Country Course. Like all other equestrian events, the eventing competition is open-gender, with both male and female athletes competing in the same division. 65 riders from 29 nations are expected to compete.

Background

This will be the 25th appearance of the event, which has been held at every Summer Olympics since it was introduced in 1912.

The two-time reigning Olympic champion is Michael Jung of Germany; Germany has won the last three events (Hinrich Romeike in 2008 before Jung in 2012 and 2016). The reigning (2018) World Champion is Rosalind Canter of Great Britain. Jung has been named to the German team.

An Olympics.com preview of equestrian (all events) provided the following overview:

Qualification

A National Olympic Committee (NOC) could enter up to 3 qualified riders in the individual eventing. Quota places are allocated to the NOC, which selects the riders. There were 65 quota places available, allocated as follows:

 Teams (45 places): Each NOC that qualified in the team eventing event entered the 3 riders from the team in the individual eventing. (This included the host nation guarantee.)
 Ranking (20 places): The top 2 riders (excluding NOCs with qualified teams) in each of the 7 geographic regions were to receive a quota place, with 6 final quota places based on rankings regardless of geographic region.

Prior to the start of the competition, three riders withdrew: Aliaksandr Faminou of Belarus (with his horse Martinie), Katrin Khoddam-Hazrati of Austria (with her horse Cosma) and Jessica Phoenix of Canada (with her horse Pavarotti).

Competition format

The eventing competition features all 65 riders competing in three rounds (dressage, cross-country, and jumping) with the top 25 advancing to a second jumping round. Scores from the first three rounds are summed to determine finalists; scores from all four rounds are summed to give a final score for the finalists.

 Dressage test: A shortened dressage competition, with penalties based on the dressage score
 Cross-country test: A race over a 4.5 kilometres cross-country course. The time allotted is 8 minutes (570 metres per minute), with penalties assessed for exceeding that time. There are a maximum of 38 obstacles, with penalties assessed for faults. Staggered starts.
 Jumping test: A 600-metre show jumping course, with 11 or 12 obstacles (including double and triple jumps, with a maximum of 16 jumps total). Maximum height of obstacles is 1.25 metres. The required speed is 375 metres/minute (time limit of 1:36). Penalties are assessed for exceeding the time limit and for faults at the obstacles.
 Final jumping test: A shorter (360–500 metres) show jumping course. Maximum obstacles is 9, with maximum 12 jumps. The speed required is still 375 metres per minute. Obstacles may be slightly higher (1.30 metres).

Schedule

The event takes place over four days, with two days for the dressage followed by cross-country and jumping on the next two days.

All times are Japan Standard Time (UTC+9).

Results

Standings after Dressage

Standings after Cross Country

Standings after Jumping (Round 1) 
Top 25 qualify for the final with a maximum of 3 riders per Nation (NOC).

Final Results after Jumping (Round 2)

References

Individual eventing